Alured Chaffee "Slim" Ransom (November 12, 1908-January 13, 1992) was an American athletics coach and sports educator who helped develop physical education programs in Afghanistan. In the United States he was a college football and basketball coach, coaching from 1941 until 1954. His career football coaching record was 30–41–2 with a winning percentage of .411. He also spent some time coaching and as an athletic director at the high school level.

International impact
Ransom was selected by the Asia Foundation to help develop physical education programs in Afghanistan for secondary schools and colleges. His work as an advisor to the minister of education in Afghanistan went for two years and included advising schools in the creation of facilities and preparation of instructors.

Playing career
Ransom was a graduate of and played football for Geneva College, where he earned 12 varsity letters. While at Geneva, he earned a Bachelor of Science in education. In 1939 he earned a Master of Education from the University of Pittsburgh.

Coaching career

Geneva
Prior to coaching at Dickinson, Ransom was the 19th head football coach at Geneva College in Beaver Falls, Pennsylvania and he held that position for four seasons, for the 1941 season, and then returned for 1946 until 1948. His coaching record at Geneva was 20–12–2. Geneva awarded a "Distinguished Service Award" to him in 1982. His coaching was interrupted by World War II and his military service (see entry below).

Washington & Jefferson
Ransom also coached at Washington & Jefferson College from 1950 to 1951, posting a losing record of 3–11, with the 1950 team compiling a winless 0–8 record.

Dickinson
Ransom was the 27th head football coach at Dickinson College in Carlisle, Pennsylvania and he held that position for three seasons, from 1952 until 1954. His football coaching record at Dickinson was 8–17. This ranks him 13th at Dickinson in terms of total wins and 24th at Dickinson in terms of winning percentage. He also was the basketball coach at Dickinson from 1953 through 1955, accumulating a 21–35 record.

Military service
He saw action during World War II while in the Navy from 1942 until 1946.

Head coaching record

Football

References

1908 births
1992 deaths
Dickinson Red Devils football coaches
Dickinson Red Devils men's basketball coaches
Geneva Golden Tornadoes football coaches
Geneva Golden Tornadoes football players
Geneva Golden Tornadoes men's basketball coaches
Washington & Jefferson Presidents football coaches
United States Navy personnel of World War II
United States Navy officers
University of Pittsburgh alumni